The Marin County Fire Department (MCFD) is the principal fire department for the county of Marin.

History 
The first formal fire department in what is now Marin County was The Tamalpais Forestry Association, formed around the turn of the 19th century. The California State Legislature had been discussing legislation for forest-fire suppression as early as 1881, but the formal department did not come into being until approximately 1901.

The Marin County Fire Department came into existence in its current incarnation on July 1, 1941 with passage of an ordinance and two resolutions by the Board of Supervisors.

Stations & Equipment

See also

Marin County

References

Video
 MCFD: Readiness is Our Business

County government agencies in California
Government of Marin County, California
Fire departments in California
1941 establishments in California